Commerce Municipal Airport  is a city-owned public airport  north of the central business district of Commerce, Texas, United States. The airport has no IATA nor ICAO designation.

The airport is used solely for general aviation purposes.

Facilities 
 Runway 18/36: 3,907 x 60 ft. (1,191 x 18 m), Surface: Asphalt

For the year ending June 23, 2016, the airport had 5,000 aircraft operations, averaging 14 per day: 100% general aviation. 14 aircraft were then based at this airport: 79% single-engine, 14% multi-engine, and 7% ultralight.

Accidents and incidents 
 October 24, 1992: A Cessna 150M, registration number N7878U, impacted terrain nose-down after the pilot lost control during an abrupt turn to dodge an unidentified runway obstruction on landing. The aircraft was destroyed; the pilot and sole occupant was seriously injured and could not recall the nature of the obstruction due to head injuries. The accident was attributed to "The pilot's failure to maintain aircraft control and the inadvertent stall. A factor was the pilot's evasive maneuver to avoid an undetermined object."

References

External links 
 Official website
  at Texas DOT Airport Directory

Airports in Texas
Airports in the Dallas–Fort Worth metroplex